The Blackfoot River is a tributary of the Snake River in the U.S. state of Idaho. Formed by the confluence of Diamond Creek and Lanes Creek, it flows  to its mouth at the Snake River. The river is part of the Columbia River Basin.

The river is named for the Blackfoot Indians even though they never lived in the area.  It was first mapped by the Lewis and Clark expedition.

Course
The Blackfoot River is formed by the joining of Diamond and Lanes creeks, in the Caribou-Targhee National Forest in Caribou County near Soda Springs, Idaho. It flows northwest through the Blackfoot Reservoir, which is used for irrigation and flood control, then west to join the Snake River in Bingham County.

The Blackfoot River's headwaters are very close to the headwaters of the Bear River and the Portneuf River. All three begin in a few square miles of relatively flat land near Soda Springs, from which some headwater streams flow north to the Blackfoot River, others south to the Bear River, and others west to the Portneuf River.

Watershed
The region the Blackfoot River flows through is covered in all its lowest portions with flows of basalt which had their origin in the Blackfoot – Gem Valley lava field.  The Blackfoot River flows from open marsh and grasslands near its source into the Blackfoot Narrows.  The Blackfoot Narrows traverses a desert canyon of primarily sagebrush and juniper habitat: an excellent place to view birds of prey. Fishing for trout is usually good.

See also
List of rivers of Idaho
List of longest streams of Idaho
Tributaries of the Columbia River

References

External links
Map of the Blackfoot river area.
Map of the Blackfoot river.
Fishing Reports of the Blackfoot River.

Rivers of Idaho
Canyons and gorges of Idaho
Rivers of Bingham County, Idaho
Rivers of Caribou County, Idaho
Tributaries of the Snake River